Alfred John "Jack" Westland (December 14, 1904 – November 3, 1982) was an American politician who served as a member of the United States House of Representatives from 1953 to 1965. He represented the Second Congressional District of Washington as a Republican. He was also an accomplished amateur golfer.

Westland was born in Everett, Washington. He was elected to the House in 1952, taking the seat previously held by Democrat Scoop Jackson who had won election to the United States Senate. Westland was re-elected in 1954, 1956, 1958, 1960, and 1962. Westland voted in favor of the Civil Rights Acts of 1957, 1960, and 1964, as well as the 24th Amendment to the U.S. Constitution. He was defeated in 1964 by Democrat Lloyd Meeds. Westland subsequently moved to California, where he lived until his death in 1982.

Golf career
Westland was an accomplished amateur golfer for over 25 years. He won the 1929 French Amateur. He finished runner-up to Francis Ouimet in the 1931 U.S. Amateur. He won the 1933 Western Amateur and played on three Walker Cup teams (1932, 1934, 1953). He was also non-playing captain of the 1961 team. In 1952, at the age of 47, Westland won the U.S. Amateur over Al Mengert. He is the oldest golfer ever to win the Amateur.

Westland also won the Pacific Northwest Amateur four times (1938, 1939, 1940, 1951), the Washington State Amateur three times (1924, 1947, 1948) and the Chicago District Amateur three times (1927, 1929, 1934).

In 1978, Westland was inducted into the Pacific Northwest Golf Association's Hall of Fame.

Tournament wins (13)
 1924 Washington State Amateur
 1927 Chicago District Amateur
 1929 French Amateur, Chicago District Amateur
 1933 Western Amateur
 1934 Chicago District Amateur
 1938 Pacific Northwest Amateur
 1939 Pacific Northwest Amateur
 1940 Pacific Northwest Amateur
 1947 Washington State Amateur
 1948 Washington State Amateur
 1951 Pacific Northwest Amateur
 1952 U.S. Amateur

Amateur majors shown in bold.

Major championships

Amateur wins (1)

Results timeline
Note: As an amateur, Westland could not play in the PGA Championship. He did not play in The Open Championship.

LA = Low Amateur
NYF = Tournament not yet founded
NT = No tournament
DNP = Did not play
"T" indicates a tie for a place
DNQ = Did not qualify for match play portion
R256, R128, R64, R32, R16, QF, SF = Round in which player lost in match play
Green background for wins. Yellow background for top-10

Sources: U.S. Open and U.S. Amateur, The Masters, 1934 British Amateur

U.S. national team appearances
Walker Cup: 1932 (winners), 1934 (winners), 1953 (winners), 1961 (winners, non-playing captain)

See also
Washington state congressional delegates

References

External links

Republican Party members of the United States House of Representatives from Washington (state)
20th-century American politicians
American male golfers
Amateur golfers
Golfers from Washington (state)
American athlete-politicians
Politicians from Everett, Washington
Burials at Arlington National Cemetery
People from Pebble Beach, California
1904 births
1982 deaths